Aadi or Aadhi or AADI may refer to:

Calendars 
 Aadi, the fourth month of the Tamil calendar.

Media

Film
 Aadi (2002 film), a 2002 Telugu film.
 Aathi, a 2006 Tamil film.
 Aadi (2016 film), a 2016 Bengali film.
 Aadhi, a 2018 Malayalam film

Actors
 Aadi (actor), a Telugu film actor.
 Aadhi Pinisetty, a Tamil and Telugu film actor.
 Aadi Adeal, a Pakistani Television actor.

Music
 Aadi (album), a 2005 album by the Syrian singer Asalah Nasri.
 Aadhi (singer), the lead vocalist of underground band Hiphop Tamizha.

Other
 AADI, association of musical interpreters in Argentina, founded in 1957.

See also
Aathi, 2006 Tamil language film.